The following highways are numbered 388:

Canada
 Quebec Route 388

Japan
 Japan National Route 388

United States
  Arkansas Highway 388
  Georgia State Route 388
  Maryland Route 388
  New York State Route 388 (former)
  Pennsylvania Route 388
  Puerto Rico Highway 388
  South Carolina Highway 388 (former)
  Tennessee State Route 388
  Virginia State Route 388